Black Belt is an American magazine covering martial arts and combat sports.

History and profile
The magazine was founded in 1961 by Mitoshi Uyehara. It was published by Uyehara under the company "Black Belt, Inc." based in Los Angeles until 1973. Although the publication went mainstream in 1961, the first magazine was produced and sold for ten cents and was put together on the kitchen floor of Uyehara's home in 1958. By the first year of producing a full publication in 1961, Uyehara was in debt for $30,000.  This story has been one that he has shared with his children and grandchild to believe in oneself and fight against the odds.  Bruce Lee contributed many articles to the publication during the 1960s. Uyehara, a martial artist in his own right, was a key personage in arranging Lee's material for publication. Uyehara is a 3rd Dan in Aikido but studied many other arts.  He is the student of Tohei Sensei, an Aikido master.  Uyehara believed that Americans could benefit from the discipline of martial arts, and his love for the art is what led to turning a hobby into a living. What began as a humble endeavor of opening the first Aikido dojo in Los Angeles, grew into a magazine, and sports exhibition. His relationship with Bruce Lee was mutual.  While Uyehara immediately saw Lee's talent and featured him in his publications, Lee reciprocated by his loyalty in only providing direct interviews to Uyehara once he reached stardom.  The two men knew they were both minorities in an art that was not embraced by Americans at the time.  The two remained close friends until Lee's death.  Uyehara has never had another best friend since the death of Lee.  Uyehara, in his own humble way, and because he recognized the value of Lee's talent, continued to perpetuate Lee's art through his own children and grandson, currently a cadet at the United States Military Academy, West Point, N.Y.

Uyehara founded "Rainbow Publications" in 1974 (based in Los Angeles, later Burbank, CA and Santa Clarita, CA), where he acted as president, but he ceased acting as an editor from this time. Uyehara moved to Honolulu in 1980, from where he continued to act as a publisher until 1998. Uyehara was originally from Lahaina, Maui, and saw the value of returning home to be close to his family. During this transitional period, the magazine underwent a frequent change in editorship (Bob MacLaughlin 1974, Rick Shively 1976, Richard Zimmerman 1978, John R. Corbett 1980, John Steward 1980, John Hanson 1981, James Nail 1982-83) until Jim Coleman became executive editor in 1984, serving until 1997. Robert W. Young succeeded Coleman in 1997/8, shortly before the acquisition of the magazine by Sabot Publishing, and remains executive editor as of 2016.

Rainbow Publications was acquired by Sabot Publishing, a publisher of "special interest publications", in 1999. Sabot Publishing was in turn acquired by Active Interest Media in 2003, from which time the magazine has been  under the supervision of "Group Publisher" (responsible for strategic development) Cheryl Angelheart. Black Belt magazine started a YouTube account in 2008 and uploads videos demonstrating martial art techniques and weapons from classical to modern styles and interviews with known martial artists, experts, and martial art news. Active Interest Media no longer owns Black Belt.

See also

Inside Kung Fu (magazine)
Kung Fu Magazine
Journal of Asian Martial Arts
Fightmag

References

External links

Digitized Black Belt Magazines from January 1962 to December 2004 on Google Books

Monthly magazines published in the United States
Sports magazines published in the United States
Martial arts magazines
Magazines established in 1961
Magazines published in Los Angeles